The 1973 edition of the Campeonato Carioca kicked off on March 10, 1973 and ended on August 22, 1973. It was organized by FCF (Federação Carioca de Futebol, or Carioca Football Federation). Twelve teams participated. Fluminense won the title for the 21st time. no teams were relegated.

System
The tournament would be divided in four stages:
 Taça Guanabara: The twelve teams all played in a single round-robin format against each other. The champions qualified to the Final phase. The eight best teams qualified to the Second round.
 Taça Francisco Laport: The remaining eight teams all played in a single round-robin format against each other. The champions qualified to the Final phase.
 Third round: The eight teams were divided into two groups of four, and each team played in a single round-robin format against the team of the other group. The champions of each group qualified to the Final phase.
Final phase: The four qualified teams played in a one-legged knockout tournament against each other - In case that the same team won two of the four positions, it'd qualify directly to the Finals. In case of a tie, the first and second round champions took precedence over the third stage winners.

Championship

Taça Guanabara

Taça Francisco Laport

Playoffs

Third round

Group A

Group B

Playoffs

Final phase

Semifinals

Finals

Top Scores

References

Campeonato Carioca seasons
Carioca